Ichneutica pagaia is a moth of the family Noctuidae. I. pagaia is endemic to New Zealand and can only be found on the Snares Islands. This species is unlikely to be confused with moths with a similar appearance as it is the only noctuid found in the Snares Islands. Its preferred habitat is tussock grasslands and the hosts for its larvae are likely Poa astonii and Poa tennantiana. Adults of this species are on the wing from November to February.

Taxonomy 
This species was described by George Hudson in 1909 from a specimen collected by Dr. Benham on the Snares Islands during the 1907 Sub-Antarctic Islands Scientific Expedition. Hudson originally named the species Leucania pagaia. The holotype specimen is held at the Museum of New Zealand Te Papa Tongarewa. In 1988 J. S. Dugdale placed this species within the Graphania genus. In 2019 Robert Hoare undertook a major review of New Zealand Noctuidae species. During this review the genus Ichneutica was greatly expanded and the genus Graphania was subsumed into that genus as a synonym. As a result of this review, this species is now known as Ichneutica pagaia.

Description 
Dugdale described the larvae of this species as follows:

Hudson described the adults of this species as follows:

The adult male has a wingspan of between 32.5 and 38 mm and the adult female has a wingspan of between 35.5 and 40 mm. As I. pagaia is the only recorded noctuid in the Snares Islands it is unlikely to be confused with other species of moth. Although it is similar in appearance to the Auckland Islands species I. erebis, I. pagaia can be distinguished as it has very pale ochreous antennae.

Distribution 
This species is endemic to New Zealand. It is only found in the Snares Islands.

Habitat 
The preferred habitat of this moth appears to be tussock grassland.

Behaviour 
The adults of this species are on the wing from November to February.

Life history and host species 

The host species for the larvae of I. pagaia are likely to be the tussock grasses Poa astonii and Poa tennantiana.

References

Moths described in 1909
Hadeninae
Moths of New Zealand
Snares Islands / Tini Heke
Taxa named by George Hudson